Ruy Blas is a 1948 French-Italian historical drama film directed by Pierre Billon and starring Danielle Darrieux, Jean Marais and Marcel Herrand. The screenplay was written by Jean Cocteau based on the 1838 play of the same title by Victor Hugo.

It was shot at the Icet Studios in Milan and on location at Cassis in Southern France. The film's sets were designed by the art director Georges Wakhévitch.

Cast
 Danielle Darrieux as La reine d'Espagne Marie de Neubourg
 Jean Marais as Ruy Blas / Don César de Bazan
 Marcel Herrand as Le marquis Don Salluste de Bazan
 Gabrielle Dorziat as La duchesse d'Albuquerque
 Alexandre Rignault as Goulatromba
 Giovanni Grasso as Don Gaspar Guritan
 Paul Amiot as Le marquis de Santa Cruz
 Jone Salinas as Casilda, la servante
 Gilles Quéant as Le duc d'Albe
 Jacques Berlioz as Un ministre
 Charles Lemontier as Le comte de Camporeal
 Pierre Magnier as Le marquis de Priego
 Armand Lurville as L'archevêque

References

Bibliography
 Chiti, Roberto & Poppi, Roberto. I film: Tutti i film italiani dal 1930 al 1944. Gremese Editore, 2005.
 Tolton, C.D.E. The Cinema of Jean Cocteau: Essays on His Films and Their Coctelian Sources. Legas, 1998.

External links

Review of film at New York Times

1948 films
Italian black-and-white films
1940s historical drama films
French historical drama films
Italian historical drama films
French black-and-white films
1940s French-language films
Films directed by Pierre Billon
Films set in Madrid
Films set in the 1690s
Films based on works by Victor Hugo
1940s French films
1940s Italian films